The 1929 Detroit Titans football team represented the University of Detroit in the 1929 college football season. Detroit outscored opponents by a combined total of 174 to 52 and finished with a 7–1–1 record in their fifth year under head coach and College Football Hall of Fame inductee, Gus Dorais. Significant games included a victories over Tulsa (21–6), West Virginia (36–0), Michigan State (25–0), a loss to Oregon State (14–7), and a tie with Marquette (6–6).

The team was led by halfback Lloyd Brazil of whom coach Dorais later said: "As far as I'm concerned, there were only three great collegiate backs in my lifetime -- Jim Thorpe, George Gipp and Lloyd Brazil."

Arthur "Bud" Boeringer and Harvey Brown were the line coaches. Johnny Fredericks was the freshman coach. Michael H. "Dad" Butler was the team's trainer.

Schedule

References

External links
 1929 University of Detroit football programs

Detroit
Detroit Titans football seasons
Detroit Titans football
Detroit Titans football